State Road 582 (SR 582) is an east–west state highway in Hillsborough County, Florida, United States. The current alignment of SR 582 is Fowler Avenue just south of the northern city limit of Tampa and Temple Terrace from Florida Avenue (U.S. Route 41 Business (US 41 Bus.)/SR 685) to US 301 (SR 41). It is the primary road to access of University of South Florida (50th Street, the former State Road 582B and now County Road 582B, forms the eastern boundary of the campus; Fletcher Avenue, the former State Road 582A that was once a segment of SR 579, forms the northern boundary). 

The road is named for Tampa civil rights activist Cody Fowler's mother Maude Fowler.

Route description 
Motorists overshooting the western terminus of SR 582 travel westward along Country Club Drive  to a T-intersection with Armenia Avenue on the western Tampa city limit, near Carrollwood; travelers overshooting the eastern terminus of SR 582 follow US 301/SR 41 near Clarkwild and toward Thonotosassa, where County Road 582 continues eastward (on Knights-Griffin Road) toward Lakeland.

Lane configurations
Between eastern terminus and Bruce B. Downs Boulevard (3 lanes each way)
Between Bruce B. Downs Boulevard and U.S. Route 41/Nebraska Avenue (4 lanes each way)
Between U.S. Route 41 and Interstate 275 (3 lanes plus turn lanes each way)
Between Interstate 275 and western terminus (2 lanes each way)

Major intersections

History 
SR 582 formerly extended west to Tarpon Springs and east to Lakeland.  A stretch of former SR 582 (locally known as Tarpon Avenue) between US 19 and Alternate US 19 in Tarpon Springs is now Pinellas County Road 582.  A stretch of former SR 582 between Thonotosassa and State Road 33 in Lakeland is now Hillsborough County Road 582 to the county line and Polk County Road 582 east of the county line.

Sources
MapSource Street Atlas of Pinellas County
MapSource Street Atlas of Hillsborough County
Various other road maps

References

External links

582
582
582